Beastmaster III: The Eye of Braxus is a 1996 American made-for-television sword and sorcery film and a sequel to the 1982 film The Beastmaster, starring Marc Singer.

Plot
In the third installment in the series, Dar, the Beastmaster (Marc Singer) teams up with Seth (Tony Todd) to rescue his brother King Tal (Casper Van Dien). They learn that the boy was captured by the evil Lord Agon (David Warner), who has been sacrificing young prisoners in order to magically retain his youth, and seeks to gain immortality by releasing the dark god Braxus from his prison. Along the way, the heroes are assisted by a beautiful witch named Morgana (Lesley-Anne Down), her acrobatic sidekick Bey (Keith Coulouris), and a warrior woman named Shada (Sandra Hess).

Cast
 Marc Singer – Dar
 Sandra Hess – Shada
 Lesley-Anne Down – Morgana
 Kimberly Stanphill – Kala
 Casper Van Dien – King Tal
 Keith Coulouris – Bey
 David Warner – Lord Agon
 Patrick Kilpatrick – Jaggart
 Tony Todd – Seth
 Michael Deak – Braxus (as Michael S. Deak)
 J. D. Hall – Braxus (voice)

External links
 
 

1996 television films
1996 films
1990s fantasy adventure films
1990s science fiction action films
American fantasy adventure films
American science fiction action films
Action television films
1990s English-language films
Films about immortality
Films based on American novels
Films based on fantasy novels
Films directed by Gabrielle Beaumont
Beastmaster films
American sword and sorcery films
NBC network original films
Television sequel films
1990s American films